A balloon pops when the material that makes up its surface tears or shreds, creating a hole. Normally, there is a balance of the balloon skin's elastic tension in which every point on the balloon's surface is being pulled by the material surrounding it. However, if a hole is made on the balloon's surface, the force becomes imbalanced, since there is no longer any force exerted by the center of the hole on the material at its edge. As a result, the balloon's surface at the edge of the hole pulls away, making it bigger; the high pressure air can then escape through the hole and the balloon pops. A balloon can be popped by either physical or chemical actions. Limpanuparb et al. use popping a balloon as a demonstration to teach about physical and chemical hazards in laboratory safety.

Physical 

A pin or needle is frequently used to pop a balloon. As the needle or pin creates a hole on the balloon surface, the balloon pops. However, if tape is placed on the part where the hole is created, the balloon will not pop since the tape helps reinforce the elastic tension in that area, preventing the edges of the hole pulling away from the center. Likewise, the thick spots of the balloon at the top and the bottom can be pierced by a needle, pin, or even skewer without the balloon popping.

Chemical

Organic solvent 

Applying an organic solvent such as toluene onto a balloon's surface can pop it, since the solvent can partially dissolve the material making up the balloon's surface.

cis-1,4-polyisoprene (solid) + organic solvent → cis-1,4-polyisoprene (partly dissolved)

Baby oil can also be applied to water balloons to pop them.

Orange peel 
Orange peel contains a compound called limonene which is a hydrocarbon compound similar to the rubber that can be used to make balloons. Based on "like dissolves like" principle, rubber balloons can be dissolved by limonene, popping the balloon. If the balloon is vulcanized (hardened with sulfur), the balloon will not pop.

Gallery

See also 
 Balloon phobia

References 

Balloons
Physics education
Chemistry classroom experiments
Articles containing video clips

External links 
 The science behind why a balloon pops when squirted with an orange peel.